South Bay may refer to:

Antarctica
 South Bay (Doumer Island)
 South Bay (Livingston Island)

Canada
 South Bay (Nunavut)
 South Bay, New Brunswick
 South Bay, Ontario

Hong Kong
  South Bay, Hong Kong, on Hong Kong Island
 Nam Wan ("South Bay"), on Tsing Yi Island, New Territories
 Tai Nam Wan ("Great South Bay"), on Tsing Yi Island, New Territories

Macau
 Nam Van ("South Bay"), on the Macau Peninsula, a former bay turned into an artificial lake

Taiwan
 South Bay (Taiwan) on Henchun Township, Pingtung County

United States

California
 South Bay (San Francisco Bay Area), a region in northern California 
 South Bay (Los Angeles County), a region in southern California
 South Bay (San Diego County), another region in southern California
 South Bay (now Fields Landing, California), a census-designated place in Humboldt County

Florida
 South Bay, Florida, a city

Massachusetts
 South Bay Interchange, Boston, a cancelled development
 South Bay, Dorchester, Boston, Massachusetts

New York
 South Bay, New York
 Great South Bay, on Long Island
 Lower South Bay, New York, also called South Bay

Texas
 South Bay (Texas), a bay in the Laguna Madre

See also